A Tale of Three Sisters is a 2019 Turkish drama film directed by Emin Alper. It was selected to compete for the Golden Bear at the 69th Berlin International Film Festival.

Cast
 Cemre Ebuzziya as Reyhan
 Ece Yüksel as Nurhan
 Helin Kandemir as Havva
 Müfit Kayacan as Sevket

References

External links
 

2019 films
2019 drama films
Turkish drama films
2010s Turkish-language films
Films directed by Emin Alper